Alakbar Taghiyev (April 28, 1924 – April 16, 1981) was Azerbaijani composer and author of popular Azerbaijani songs.

Biography
He was born in 1922, in Ganja, into a large, low-income family. At the age of 14, he began to work in case of need in secretariat of judicial trials. 
Soviet Union Judicial Institute and after graduation began to work in Goychay as an investigator. He worked in Public Procurators' Office more than 30 years and worked till being a chief of investigation department of Public Procurators' Office of Baku city. He died in Baku.

Creativity
From Alakbar's youth people around him noticed his musical talent, but he chose the other way and engaged in jurisprudence. But absence of special musical talent didn't prevent him from composing his first song called  ("Neighbour Girl") in 1958, which was heard on the air of Azerbaijan State Television performed by Zeynab Khanlarova. The prominent musician Akif Bakikhanov helped Alakbar Taghiyev to become a composer. Later, Alakbar Taghiyev composed more than 2000 songs and many of them are stored in archive of the composer's son, and only more than 200 of them have been dubbed. His songs were performed by such prominent Azerbaijani singers as Rashid Behbudov, Shovkat Alakbarova, Sara Gadimova, Rubaba Muradova, Zeynab Khanlarova, Islam Rzayev, Flora Kerimova, Nisa Gasimova, Mammadbaghir Baghirzade, Faig Aghayev and others. Because of the absence of the musical education Alakbar Taghiyev was not allowed to the Union of Azerbaijani Composers, but in spite of that he was chosen to the Musical Fund of the USSR at the eminent Azerbaijani conductor Niyazi's and composer Tofig Guliyev's insistence.

Singers return to Alakbar Taghiyev's creativity up till now and his songs enter not only Azerbaijani singers' but also foreign singers' repertoire, too. Melody of the composer's well-known  song was performed by Azerbaijani musician Alihan Samedov on balaban in Turkey and on nai by famous Moldavian naist Konstantin Moskovich, and also was sung by Turkish singer Sibel Can and Russians singers Byanka and Sogdiana.

Videolinks
 San galmaz oldun song performed by Alihan Samedov.
 San galmaz oldun song performed by Sogdiana – "Vspominay menya" ("Remember me").

Audiolinks
 San galmaz oldun  song performed by Byanka – "Izmena" ("Betrayal").
 San galmaz oldun  song performed by Sogdiana – "Vspominay menya" ("Remember me").
 San galmaz oldun song performed by Faig Aghayev.

References

1922 births
1981 deaths
Musicians from Ganja, Azerbaijan
Soviet composers
Soviet male composers
Azerbaijani composers
Soviet pianists
Azerbaijani pianists
20th-century pianists
20th-century classical musicians
20th-century composers
20th-century male musicians
Kutafin Moscow State Law University alumni